Clann Éireann, also known as the People's Party, was a minor republican political party in the Irish Free State. The party was founded on 25 January 1926 as a result of a split from the ruling Cumann na nGaedheal party, to protest against the Boundary Commission report, which permanently demarcated the border between the Free State and Northern Ireland. Clann Éireann was the leading representative of constitutional republicanism in Dáil Éireann until the success of Fianna Fáil at the June 1927 general election.

The party chairman was Professor William Magennis, Teachta Dála (TD) for the National University. The secretaries included Pádraic Ó Máille TD for Galway. Other prominent members of the party included Maurice George Moore, who at the time was a member of the senate, and Christopher Byrne, who was a sitting TD for Wicklow who was one of those who had resigned from Cumann na nGaedheal over the Boundary issue.

The party demanded for Ireland "one and indivisible as of right the full status of a sovereign State. We aim at restoring the unity of her territory and the union of all her people under one central supreme government". The party advocated the abolition of the Oath of Allegiance to the British King. It also called for lower taxes and less legislation. In policies like trade protectionism and the abolition of the Oath of Allegiance, it agreed with the agenda of Sinn Féin leader Éamon de Valera. An attempt to lure de Valera and his followers into the party failed. After de Valera created the Fianna Fáil party in March 1926, Clann Éireann grew closer to that group.

The party attracted little support and it failed to win any seats in Dáil Éireann at the June 1927 general election. Its seven candidates only attracted a few thousand first preference votes. Seven of them were last in their constituencies and forfeited their deposits. On 28 August 1927, the party issued a statement supporting Fianna Fáil, and ceased political activity.

References

 The Times, editions of 27 January 1926, 12 April 1926, 14 June 1927, 17 June 1927 and 30 August 1927.
 Barberis, Peter, John McHugh and Mike Tyldesley, 2005. Encyclopedia of British and Irish Political Organisations. London: Continuum International Publishing Group. , 
 Manning, Maurice, 1972. Irish Political Parties: An Introduction. Dublin: Gill and Macmillan. 

Political parties established in 1926
Defunct political parties in the Republic of Ireland
Political parties disestablished in 1927
Irish republican parties
1926 establishments in Ireland
1927 disestablishments in Ireland